GBA-7 (Skardu-I) is a constituency of Gilgit Baltistan Assembly which is currently being held by Raja Zakarya Maqoon of  Pakistan Tehreek-e-Insaf.

History 
In 2009, Syed Mehdi Shah won the constituency and became the first Gilgit Baltistan Chief Minister.

Members

Election results

2009
Syed Mehdi Shah of PPP became member of assembly by getting 6,997 votes.

2015
Akbar Khan Taban of Pakistan Muslim League (N) won this seat by getting 3,331 votes.

References

Gilgit-Baltistan Legislative Assembly constituencies